Jacob E. Freeman (1841 - 1900) was a state legislator in Texas. He served in the Texas House of Representatives in the Fourteenth Texas Legislature and Sixteenth Texas Legislature. He later ran for governor.

He is listed on a plaque.

See also
African-American officeholders during and following the Reconstruction era

References

1841 births
1900 deaths
19th-century American politicians
Republican Party members of the Texas House of Representatives
African-American state legislators in Texas